Sally Dryer (also known as Sally Dryer-Baker; born February 10, 1957) is an American former child voice actress, artist, and store owner best known for her voice-over work in the 1960s.

Career
Dryer provided the voices for several Peanuts characters in television specials and film from 1965 to 1969. Dryer first started as the voice of Violet in A Boy Named Charlie Brown (1963) and A Charlie Brown Christmas (1965), before going on to Lucy in four Peanuts specials Charlie Brown's All-Stars (1966), It's the Great Pumpkin, Charlie Brown (1966), You're in Love, Charlie Brown (1967), and He's Your Dog, Charlie Brown (1968).

Dryer then provided the voice of Patty (not to be confused with the character of Peppermint Patty) in the feature film A Boy Named Charlie Brown. Dryer's last stint with the Peanuts gang was performing the voices of Clara, Shirley, and Sophie in It Was a Short Summer, Charlie Brown.

Dryer also starred as herself in a pair of recent documentaries on the 1960s Peanuts television phenomenon. Dryer was interviewed on the special documentary You Don't Look 40, Charlie Brown (1990); and on the documentary The Making of "A Charlie Brown Christmas" (2001).

Personal life 
She is openly lesbian and lives with her partner.

Filmography

References

External links

1957 births
Living people
American child actresses
American television actresses
American voice actresses
American lesbian actresses
LGBT people from California
People from Burlingame, California
21st-century American women